Percy-en-Auge (literally Percy in Auge) is a former commune in the Calvados department in the Normandy region in northwestern France. On 1 January 2017, it was merged into the new commune Mézidon Vallée d'Auge. It is the ancestral home of the House of Percy.

Since 1988 it has been twinned with the English parish of Nursling and Rownhams in Hampshire.

Population

See also
Communes of the Calvados department

References

Former communes of Calvados (department)
Calvados communes articles needing translation from French Wikipedia